Biely Kostol is a village and municipality of Trnava District in the Trnava region of Slovakia. As of the 2018 census, the population was 2,113, with the sex ratio being 50.8% male & 49.2% female.

Climate 
Biely Kostol has a Marine west coast, warm summer climate (Classification: Cfb).

See also
 List of municipalities and towns in Slovakia

References

Genealogical resources

The records for genealogical research are available at the state archive "Statny Archiv in Bratislava, Slovakia"

 Roman Catholic church records (births/marriages/deaths): 1708-1899 (parish B)

External links
 
 
Mestská a obecná štatistika SR 
Surnames of living people in Biely

Villages and municipalities in Trnava District